Countess of Powis is the title given to the wife of the Earl of Powis and has been held by a number of women, including:

Elizabeth Herbert, Marchioness of Powis (c.1634-1691)
Barbara Herbert, Countess of Powis (1735-1786)
Henrietta Clive, Countess of Powis (1755-1830)
Lucy Herbert, Countess of Powis (1793-1875)
Violet Herbert, Countess of Powis (1865-1929)